Sérgio Severino da Silva known as Serginho (little Sérgio)  (born 27 September 1978), is a Brazilian footballer.

Serginho spent most of his career in native Pernambuco and nearby Northeast states. He played a few seasons in Campeonato Brasileiro Série C and was a substitute player of Sport Recife in Série A and Série B.

Biography
Born in Recife, capital of Pernambuco state, he played for Campeonato Pernambucano side Ypiranga in 2005. He then left for Vera Cruz of Vitória de Santo Antão in April. In July he left for city rival Vitória of Série C. He did not play the last 2 matches of the group stage as the team certainly disqualified for the next round.

In December 2005 he left for Sport Recife in 1-year contract, finished as the runner-up of 2006 Campeonato Brasileiro Série B. He left the club in July 2007, for Central de Caruaru of Série C. After the team eliminated in the first stage, he joined Salgueiro in August, winning 2007 Campeonato Pernambucano Second Division. He returned to Sport Recife in late 2007 and played the last round of 2007 Campeonato Brasileiro Série A.

In January 2008 he left for ASA until the end of 2008 Campeonato Alagoano. In June he left for Sergipe side Confiança. He was the regular starter in the first 2 stages of 2008 Campeonato Brasileiro Série C, played 16 out of 18 matches. But after substituted in the first half of the fourth game of the final stage (total 14 games), he never played again. Confiança finished seventh that season. He signed a 1-year extension in December 2008. He played 3 times in 2009 Série C. He extended his contract again in December 2009.

In June he returned to Salgueiro and played 10 games in 2010 Campeonato Brasileiro Série C, as losing semi-finalists.

In December 2010 he was signed by Marília until the end of 2011 Campeonato Paulista Série A2. As the team had another Serginho, Sérgio Severino da Silva was known as Serginho Pernambucano that season.

On 14 March 2011 he was signed by Paraíba side Campinense until the end of 2011 Campeonato Brasileiro Série C.

Honours
 Campeonato Pernambucano: 2006, 2007
 Campeonato Sergipano: 2009
 Campeonato Pernambucano Second Division: 2007

References

External links
 CBF   (Old Archive)
 
 Futpedia 
 meusport

Brazilian footballers
Sport Club do Recife players
Central Sport Club players
Salgueiro Atlético Clube players
Agremiação Sportiva Arapiraquense players
Associação Desportiva Confiança players
Marília Atlético Clube players
Campinense Clube players
Association football fullbacks
Sportspeople from Recife
1978 births
Living people